The 11th Kentucky Infantry Regiment was an infantry regiment that served in the Union Army during the American Civil War.

Service attachments
The 11th Kentucky Infantry Regiment was organized at Camp Calhoun in Calhoun, Kentucky, and mustered in for a three-year enlistment on December 9, 1861, under the command of Colonel Pierce Butler Hawkins.

The regiment was attached to a series of larger units over the course of the war:

 14th Brigade, Army of the Ohio, December 1861
 14th Brigade, 5th Division, Army of the Ohio. 
 14th Brigade, 5th Division, II Corps, Army of the Ohio, September 1862
 1st Brigade, 3rd Division, Left Wing, XIV Corps, Army of the Cumberland, November 1862
 1st Brigade, 3rd Division, XXI Corps, Army of the Cumberland, January 1863
 District of Western Kentucky, Department of the Ohio, April 1863
 3rd Brigade, 3rd Division, XXIII Corps, Army of the Ohio, June 1863 
 Unattached, in Bowling Green, Kentucky, 1st Division, XXIII Corps, August 1863
 1st Brigade, 4th Division, XXIII Corps, October 1863
 3rd Brigade, 1st Division, Cavalry Corps, Department of the Ohio, November 1863
 3rd Brigade, 4th Division, XXIII Corps, April 1864
 3rd Brigade, 3rd Division, XXIII Corps, June 1864
 1st Brigade, 3rd Division, XXIII Corps, August 1864 to December 1864.

The 11th Kentucky Infantry mustered out of service on December 16, 1864.

Service details
The unit was involved in major and minor engagements from 1862 through 1864.

1861 

 Duty at Calhoun, Ky., until February 1862.

1862 

 Advance on Bowling Green, Ky., and Nashville, Tenn., February 10–25.
 Occupation of Nashville February 25.
 March to Savannah, Tenn., March 17-April 6.
 Battle of Shiloh April 7.
 Advance on and siege of Corinth, Miss., April 29-May 30.
 Buell's Campaign in northern Alabama and middle Tennessee June to August.
 March to Louisville, Ky., in pursuit of Bragg August 21-September 26.
 Pursuit of Bragg into Kentucky October 1–20.
 Battle of Perryville, Ky., October 8 (reserve).
 Nelson's Cross Roads and Rural Hill October 18.
 March to Nashville, Tenn., October 20-November 7, and duty there until December 26.
 Advance on Murfreesboro December 26–30.
 Nolensville December 26–27.
 Battle of Stones River December 30–31, 1862 and January 1–3, 1863.
 1863

 Ordered to Kentucky January 8, 1863. Duty at Bowling Green, Ky., until July. Regiment mounted and operating against guerrillas.
 Expedition to Tennessee state line May 2–6.
 Woodburn and South Union May 13.
 At Glasgow, Ky., July to September.
 March to Knoxville, Tenn., and Burnside's Campaign in eastern Tennessee September to November.
 Philadelphia October 24.
 Leiper's Ferry, Holston River, October 27.
 Knoxville Campaign November 4 to December 23.
 Rockford and near Loudon November 14.
 Lenoir Station, Stock Creek and Holston River November 15.
 Near Knoxville November 16.
 Siege of Knoxville November 17-December 5.
 About Bean's Station December 9–13.
 Russellville December 10.
 Bean's Station December 13, 14 and 15.
 Rutledge December 16.
 Blain's Cross Roads December 16–19.
 Scout to Bean's Station December 29–30.
 1864

 About Dandridge January 26–28, 1864.
 Fair Garden January 27.
 Moved to Mt. Sterling, Ky., February 1864.
 Dismounted and marched to Knoxville, Tenn. Duty there and at crossing of the Hiawassee operating against Wheeler and guarding Sherman's communications until June.
 Joined Sherman at Kingston, Ga. Operations about Marietta and against Kennesaw Mountain June 10-July 2.
 Lost Mountain June 15–17.
 Muddy Creek June 17.
 Noyes Creek June 19.
 Cheyney's Farm June 22.
 Olley's Creek June 26–27.
 Assault on Kennesaw June 27.
 Nickajack Creek July 2–5.
 Chattahoochie River July 6–17.
 Peachtree Creek July 19–20.
 Siege of Atlanta July 22-August 25.
 Utoy Creek August 5–7.
 Flank movement on Jonesboro August 25–30.
 Battle of Jonesboro August 31-September 1.
 Lovejoy's Station September 2–6.
 Operations against Hood in northern Georgia and northern Alabama October 1–26.
 Moved to Nashville, thence to Pulaski, Tenn.
 Ordered to Louisville, Ky., November 14; thence to Bowling Green, Ky., and duty there until December.

Casualties 
The regiment lost a total of 264 men; 2 officers and 45 enlisted men were killed or mortally wounded, while 3 officers and 214 enlisted men died of disease.

Commanders
 Colonel Pierce Butler Hawkins
 Colonel S. P. Love
 Major Erasmus L. Mottley

See also

 List of Kentucky Civil War Units
 Kentucky in the Civil War

External links
 History of the Eleventh Kentucky Volunteer Infantry Regiment: Union Army; by William M Wilson 2006; Library of Congress
 William Michael Wilson (WKU Manuscripts and Folklife Archives)
  For Union, for Confederacy, for Slavery: Motivation for Enlisting and Serving Among Kentucky's Civil War Soldiers; by James F. Osborne; University of Louisville 2011

References
 Dyer, Frederick H.  A Compendium of the War of the Rebellion (Des Moines, IA:  Dyer Pub. Co.), 1908.
Attribution

External links
 Alphabetical roster of the 11th Kentucky taken from Thomas Speed's Union Regiments of Kentucky

Military units and formations established in 1861
Military units and formations disestablished in 1864
Units and formations of the Union Army from Kentucky
1861 establishments in Kentucky